Normal order may refer to:

 Normal order of creation and annihilation operators in theoretical physics
 Normal order evaluation in computer science
 Normal order of an arithmetic function in number theory

See also
 Normal (disambiguation)
 Regular (disambiguation)
 Regular order (disambiguation)